Fiona Horne (born 1966 in Sydney) is the former lead singer of 1990s Australian electro-rock band, Def FX, before continuing on to author several best-selling books on Modern Witchcraft.  She is a popular radio and television personality, appearing on many programs around the world.  She is now a commercial pilot, humanitarian aid worker, world record holding skydiver, professional fire dancer, yoga instructor and freediver.

Musical career

1984–1989: Sister Sludge and The Mothers
Horne started playing in bands when she moved to Adelaide, South Australia, in 1984. Her first band was Sister Sludge, which only lasted for six months until Horne moved back to Sydney. She then formed a punk-thrash band, The Mothers, in 1985. The Mothers started as an all-girl punk band, although the lineup changed a number of times. This was the first band with Horne performing both vocals and guitar. In October 1987, The Mothers, comprising Horne (vocals, guitar), Nat (guitar), Jo Collings (bass) and Rick (drums), released their first single, "Drives Me Wild"/"Get Outta My Life", which was followed in 1989 by the EP, 12-Incher, with the line-up of Horne (guitar, vocals), Rick (drums), Luke (guitar) and Cristina Calero (bass), both of which were released on the Waterfront Records label. The Mothers broke up in 1989.

1990–1997: Def FX

In 1990 Horne formed the industrial-dance-rock band Def FX with Blake Gardner (guitar; ex-Bezerk), Sean Lowry (synthesisers, sequencers, samples; ex-King Prawn), Martyn Basha (bass; ex-Bezerk). The band issued three EPs, Water, in June 1991, Surge, in November and Blink in June 1992 on the Phantom label before signing to EMI. In December 1992 the band released their debut album, Light Speed Collision. At the 1994 Big Day Out Horne made headlines by appearing topless on stage. In September 1994, they released the EP Post Moronic, which reached No. 43 on the Australian charts. The band were dropped from the EMI label. In May 1995 they released their second album, Ritual Eternal, on their own label, Cicada. They then signed with Universal Music Australia's subsidiary label Grudge, which released the band's third album, Majick, in July 1996. Def FX disbanded in May 1997.

1998–2011: Solo career
In 1998 Horne made several appearances on the television series Good News Week, singing duets with the show's host, Paul McDermott. Virgin/EMI subsequently released a single of their duet, "Shut Up/Kiss Me", in November 1998, which reached No. 48 on the Australian singles charts in December.

In October 1999, Horne released her debut single, "Let’s Go Out Tonight", on Air Records. The song was co-written with Pete Farnan (Boom Crash Opera) and Simon Austin (Frente!).

In March 2007, Horne released her first solo album Witch Web. 
In 2010, she released the spoken word album Magickal Life-Guided Meditations and Spells for Positive Change, on her own label, Mystic Monkey.

2012–present: Def FX reformation and formation of Seawitch
In 2012, Def FX reformed for a national tour in May–June, playing in Brisbane, Sydney, Melbourne, Hobart and Adelaide. This was followed by another tour in October - November 2013 with the band playing shows in Adelaide, Melbourne, Newcastle, Sydney and Brisbane.  The band toured again in 2019 ... originally performed as a farewell tour, the band decided to rename it, 'The Never Say Never Tour' and will return.

As of 2022, Fiona is the lead singer of Seawitch, a newly formed Australian power grunge rock band. According to Seawitch’s website, Horne’s ‘bewitching’ lyrics are conjured from her personal ‘Book of Shadows.’

Modelling and acting
In October 1994, she featured in a nude pictorial in Black+White magazine. In 1998 she was featured in the September issue of Ralph,  FHM Australia and on the cover of the November issue of Australian Playboy. After moving to Los Angeles in 2001, Horne featured in the October 2005 issue of Playboy.

In 2001, Horne starred in the Australian opening season of Eve Ensler's theatrical production The Vagina Monologues; she also appeared in an episode of the Australian television series Pizza that year.  Horne has continued to act, appearing in the 2005 film, Unbeatable Harold, which starred Dylan McDermott and Henry Winkler and the 2007 film Cult, starring Rachel Miner and Taryn Manning. Horne also appeared in the independent fantasy features, Fable-Teeth of Beasts and Ember Days.

In 2004, Horne was a host (called an 'Alt') in the reality television show Mad Mad House for the Sci Fi Channel. She also competed in Australian Celebrity Survivor: Vanuatu for the Seven Network Australia (which aired in August 2006).

Personal life
Horne is currently a commercial pilot and works for a charter company based in the Caribbean.  She also co-ordinates and executes humanitarian aid missions.

Horne also works as a yoga instructor and professional fire dancer - she performs regularly in the Caribbean at resorts and private events, as well as special engagements in New Orleans and Los Angeles.

Horne is vegetarian and was formerly vegan.

In July 2017, Rockpool Publishing Australia published Horne's autobiography, The Naked Witch.  In 2019 her manifesto The Art of Witch and debut oracle deck, The Magick of You Oracle were published by Rockpool.  In 2021 her guide to Witchcraft, Teen Magick - Witchcraft for a New Generation was released by Rockpool/Simon & Schuster.  Horne relocated to Western Australia to conduct a book tour and explore new opportunities in the wake of international lockdowns and closures. Perth Now

In 2020 Horne formed music duo, Spiff & Fifi with Dave Hopkins (The Hellmenn) and heavy rock band, Seawitch also with Hopkins. Both acts are toured Western Australia, with single and album releases signed with The Manick Label/Ingrooves Universal. She is in a relationship with Dave Hopkins, after having left the Caribbean to live with him in Western Australia, where she currently resides

Bibliography

Discography

Albums

Singles

Filmography

References

Sources
 'Def FX' entry at Encyclopedia of Australian Rock and Pop by Ian McFarlane
 Fiona Horne (Chaos Control interview, October 2003)
 Fiona Horne (Stellar Magazine interview, July 2017)
 Fiona Horne (The Spirit of Things ABC Radio National interview, July 2017)
 Fiona Horne (50 So What interview - book extract, July 2017)
 Fiona Horne (Popstar to Pilot - WHO Weekly Magazine, August 2017)
 Fiona Horne (The Morning Show Channel 7 Australia July 2017)
  (Raise The Horns, An Interview with Fiona Horne by Jason Mankey, PATHEOS April 2018)
 Horne shares her modern witch fix (Perth Now, Interview with Fiona Horne by Belle Taylor, The West Australian October 2020)

External links
 
 

1966 births
Living people
Australian women singers
Australian rock singers
Australian songwriters
Musicians from Sydney
Australian Wiccans
Participants in American reality television series
Australian non-fiction writers
21st-century Australian women writers
21st-century Australian writers
Australian television presenters
Participants in Australian reality television series
Australian women television presenters
Australian Survivor contestants